The imperial election of 1575 was an imperial election held to select the emperor of the Holy Roman Empire.  It took place in Regensburg on October 27.

Background 
The Holy Roman Emperor Maximilian II, Holy Roman Emperor called for the election of his successor.  He held one vote, as king of Bohemia.  The remaining prince-electors called to Regensburg were:

 Daniel Brendel von Homburg, elector of Mainz
 Jakob von Eltz-Rübenach, elector of Trier
 Salentin IX of Isenburg-Grenzau, elector of Cologne
 Frederick III, Elector Palatine, elector of the Electoral Palatinate
 Augustus, Elector of Saxony, elector of Saxony
 John George, Elector of Brandenburg, elector of Brandenburg

Elected 
Maximilian's eldest son Rudolf II, Holy Roman Emperor was elected.

Aftermath 
Rudolf acceded to the throne on his father's death on October 12, 1576

1575
1575 in the Holy Roman Empire
16th-century elections
Rudolf II, Holy Roman Emperor
Non-partisan elections